HM Prison Hindley  is a male prison
, located in the village of Bickershaw (near Wigan) in Greater Manchester, England. Hindley is operated by His Majesty's Prison Service.

History
Hindley Prison opened in 1961 as a Borstal. In 1983 it was re-classified as a Youth Custody Centre. Hindley was then re-classified as an adult prison and in 1997 it became a joint prison and Young Offenders Institution. In 2015 Hindley was reclassified as a full adult jail for offenders over the age of 21.

In 2002, His Majesty's Chief Inspector of Prisons recorded many good initiatives taking place at Hindley, particularly in suicide prevention, drugs strategy, sentence planning and joint work with the police service to monitor and act on racial incidents. However the Inspector criticised inadequate reception procedures, insufficient purposeful activity and patchy help with resettlement at the prison.

In December 2004 a security alert was sparked when two inmates staged a roof-top protest at Hindley Prison.

More than 100 extra staff were drafted in to deal with a riot at the prison on 5 October 2005. It took more than seven weeks to fully restore the prison wing after the riot which caused more than £145,000 damage.

The prison today
The Youth Justice Board announced on 23 October 2014  that it will be withdrawing completely from Hindley.
Hindley Prison is no longer a youth offender prison. It holds Category C male prisoners from the age of 21 upwards. Accommodation at the prison is made up of seven secure units, consisting of single and double cells.

Hindley is a combined establishment with a regime that offers opportunities for inmates to gain qualifications, address offending behaviour, and reintegrate into society on their release. Regime provision includes learning and skills, as well as workshop places (which include construction skills) and physical education.

Hindley also operates a listener and peer support scheme for those who may be at risk of suicide or self-harm. The prison's medical provision includes an in-patient healthcare facility and a mental health day care centre.

Notable inmates
Will Cornick, jailed in 2014 for a minimum of 20 years for murdering his schoolteacher

References

External links
 Ministry of Justice pages on Hindley
 HMP Hindley - HM Inspectorate of Prisons Reports

Prisons in Greater Manchester
Young Offender Institutions in England
Juvenile prisons in England
1961 establishments in England